The 1976–77 Illinois Fighting Illini men's basketball team represented the University of Illinois.

Regular season
The 1976-77 team would include Lou Henson's first group of recruited athletes. Levi Cobb, Neil Bresnahan, and Steve Lanter contributed to a quick start on the season and a 7-1 record. The team's only loss was by 1 point at the hands of Missouri in the Show Me Classic played in Columbia, MO. Before the Big Ten season commenced the Illini had staked themselves to an 8-4 record, yet the fans support still did not yet believe in Henson's squad.

A mere 6,938 fans attended a mid-December Saturday afternoon game versus Arizona State. Even with fewer fans coming out, the team set a series of offensive records in the Big Ten opener against Ohio State.  The records included converting on 19 of their first 21 shots and shooting 69.4 percent for the game.

During the course of the season the Illini would lose twice to the Golden Gophers, however, before the NCAA Tournament it was determined that Minnesota had committed violations that resulted in sanctions against them, including the forfeiture of all of their games.  This gave the Illini two additional wins and a final record of 16-14, with an 8-10 conference mark.

The team's starting lineup included
Rick Leighty, Ken Ferdinand and Levi Cobb as forwards, Audie Matthews and Steve Lanter at the guard positions, and Rich Adams playing center.

Roster

Source

Schedule
																																																
Source																																																																																																
																																																
|-																																																
!colspan=12 style="background:#DF4E38; color:white;"| Non-Conference regular season
	
	
	
	
	
	
	
	
	
	
	

|-
!colspan=9 style="background:#DF4E38; color:#FFFFFF;"|Big Ten regular season	
	
	
	
	
	
	
	
	
	
	
	
	
	
	

	
		
|-

Player stats

Awards and honors
Audie Matthews
Team Most Valuable Player

Team players drafted into the NBA

Rankings

References

Illinois Fighting Illini
Illinois Fighting Illini men's basketball seasons
Illinois Fighting Illini men's basketball team
Illinois Fighting Illini men's basketball team